Rassheyevka is a rural locality in Glebovsky Selsoviet Rural Settlement, Fatezhsky District, Kursk Oblast, Russia. The population as of 2010 is 4.

References

Notes

Sources

Rural localities in Fatezhsky District